Riley & Durrant are an electronic music production and DJ duo based in Leeds, UK.

Andi Durrant and Nick Riley met whilst DJing together at Sheffield super-club Gatecrasher in 2002 and have been producing music since 2003.

Most notable for their UK radio shows and residencies at Privilege Ibiza, Riley & Durrant have been influential in playing and promoting underground electronic music in the UK for the last 10 years.

Radio 
Between them, Riley & Durrant formerly presented two specialist dance programs on the Galaxy FM network, including Andi Durrant's Saturday Warmup and their Friday night showcase for underground, unsigned and unheard electronic music.

Andi Durrant now presents Friday and Saturday night's on The Capital FM Network across the UK

They also run their own production company Distorted Productions Ltd, making specialist radio shows, documentaries and idents for UK and international radio stations.

In 2007 Andi Durrant won the bronze award at the Sony Radio Academy Awards. In 2008 he received the much coveted Gold Award as Music Broadcaster of the Year, and in 2009 he won the Silver award for best Specialist Music Program.

They have also previously been heard on Vonyc Radio in Germany, and regularly on Dubai 92, Global Radio and HFM Ibiza.

DJ highlights 
They have played at most of the UK dance festivals from Creamfields to Global Gathering and played internationally across Russia, Asia, USA and Europe. They are one of the few British acts to have played at the Fort Dance festival in St Petersberg, where they did their first live set in 2004.

On New Year's Eve 2007/08 Riley & Durrant headlined their own event on the world's largest man-made beach in Kaula Lumpur, Malaysia.

Andi and Nick have been regulars in Ibiza during the summer months, playing at the world-famous Café Mambo, and broadcasting live from Amnesia, Space and Eden.

For the 2008 and 2009 Ibiza seasons Riley & Durrant were part of the biggest night in Ibiza when they were asked to be weekly residents at Privilege Ibiza (Worlds Biggest Club) to provide the sound of the second room at Tiësto’s sell-out concerts and warm up for him in the main room. In 2010 Riley & Durrant will be playing the Terrace for rival club Cream at Amnesia with Calvin Harris.

Most weekends Riley & Durrant can be found playing across Britain from the famous superclubs like Cream, Gatecrasher, Ministry of Sound and Godskitchen, to smaller more intimate venues around the country.

Studio 
In 2008 Nick and Andi opened a recording studio in Leeds City Centre with fellow Leeds residents The Utah Saints.

Music & releases 

The first few Riley & Durrant releases in 2003 sat firmly in the trance and melodic genres, on European record labels like Black Hole and United, including their debut track "Candesco" (of which only 500 copies were ever pressed onto vinyl but subsequently became a collectors classic, with copies going for over £50 on eBay). Over the subsequent years, Riley & Durrant have become difficult to pigeon-hole musically, with support for their music coming from a wide cross section of DJs – from underground house heroes like Laurent Garnier, Krafty Kuts and Sander Klienenberg to superstars Armin Van Buuren, Laidback Luke, Axwell, Paul Van Dyk and Tiesto.

There is no doubt Riley & Durrant are no longer part of the international trance scene, having developed their music and DJ sets into a much broader house-focussed sound, although they often straddle house, progressive and techno, and also play Drum 'n' Bass and Breakbeat on their radio programs.

Their debut artist album "Research & Development" was released summer 2007, and reached the iTunes top 50 in the first month of sales, receiving great critical acclaim for its unique genre-bending sound:
 "Adventurous and experimental – 4 Stars" – IDJ Mag
 "Without a doubt the best artist album of the year" – Contactmusic.com
 "This album will cross boundaries" – Dancenode
 "Quirky but Cool" – Mixmag
 "This only serves to emphasize how far R&D have come – 4/5" – DJ Magazine

Alongside their commercial releases, Riley & Durrant have written a number of pieces of music for film and television, such as Sky One and ITV.

Record label 
In 2007 Andi and Nick launched their Nu Breed Music record label to put out some of the vast number of tracks they were being sent by young up-and-coming music producers for their radio shows.

Nu Breed Music was closed in 2008 following a settlement with Ministry of Sound to use the trademark for their Global Underground compilations.

Riley & Durrant launched the Electrik Playground record label and club nights in 2009

Discography

Original tracks and singles 
 Hauswerks vs Riley & Durrant – Bellydancer (303 Lovers) June 10
 Riley & Durrant ft This Morning Call – All I Leave Behind (Electric Playground) May 10
 Council Estate Supermodels ft Riley & Durrant – Keep Smiling (Electrik Playground) Apr 10
 Riley & Durrant vs Juan Kidd – "Da Bass" (CR2) Feb 2010
 Riley & Durrant – "Jagerbomb" (Electrik Playground) Nov 09
 Riley & Durrant – "Remote Control" (Nu Breed Music) Jun 08
 Electrik Playground – "Electrik Playground" (Nu Breed Music) Jun 08
 Riley & Durrant  – "Aurora" (Newstate Music) Jan 08
 Riley & Durrant with Hauswerks – Experiment No. 2 (Newstate Music) Jan 08
 Riley & Durrant ft Gina Dootson – "Hollow" (Newstate Music) June 7
 Riley & Durrant "Neon Eyes" (United) March 6
 Riley & Durrant "Home" (Blackhole) Jan 06
 Riley & Durrant "The Code" (Blackhole) Jan 06
 Riley & Durrant "Suddenly" (Monster) Nov 05
 Riley & Durrant "Exile" (Distorted) April 4
 Riley & Durrant "Candesco" (Recover) May 3

Remixes 

 Karen Ruimy – Come With Me (Andi Durrant & Steve More Remix) / (Riley & Durrant Remix) Sept 12
 Sulpher vs Riley & Durrant – Tomorrow (Original) White June 2012
 Paul Van Dyk – Eternity (Riley & Durrant Remix) 3Beat March 2012
 Chicane – Thousand Mile Stare (Riley & Durrant Remix) Modena Nov 2011
 Kerli – Army of Love (Riley & Durrant Remix / Dub) Island Records USA June 2011
 Laidback Luke, Steve Aoki & Lil John – Turbulence (Riley & Durrant Remix) Newstate June 2011
 Sarah Atereth – Without You (Riley & Durrant Remix) March 2011
 Backyard Orchestra – Smiling Faces (Original and Riley & Durrant Mixes) CR2 Summer 2011
 Felix Leiter vs Dario G – Sunchyme 2010 (Riley & Durrant Remix) Electrik Playground Nov 2010
 D:Ream – Gods In the Making (Riley & Durrant Remix) Feb 2011
 K Klass – Capture Me (Riley & Durrant Mix) Nocturnal Groove Jan 2011
 Moog Daddies – Gucha (Riley & Durrant Remix) Oxyd Records July 2010
 Hannah – I Believe (Riley & Durrant Remix) Snowdog Records June 2010
 Scott Mac – Damager (Riley & Durrant Remix) Black Hole April 2010
 Chicane – Are You Listening (Riley & Durrant Remix) Modena April 2010
 68 Beats – Are You Listening (Riley & Durrant Mix) Juicy Music Jan 2010
 Snow Patrol – Just Say Yes (Riley & Durrant Mix) 
 Dimitri Vegas & Like Mike – Under The Water (Riley & Durrant Mix) BHM Oct 09
 Blue Pearl – Naked In The Rain (Riley & Durrant Mix) Suesse 
 Origin Unknown – Valley of the Shadows (Bootleg Remix) (White) Feb 09
 Just Jack – Embers (Bootleg Remix) (White) Feb 09
 Sylvia Tosun ft  Loverush UK – 5 Reasons (SeatoSun) Jan 09
 DJ Antoine – This TIme (AATW) Jan 09
 Juan Kidd – "Putayn" (Nu Breed Music) Aug 09
 Cube Guys – "Baba O’Riley" (Data Records) Jun 08
 Richard Coleman – "Haymaker" (Suesse Records) May 8
 CNTRL ALT DLETE – "Hit My Stix" (Bandito Records) May 8
 Brother Brown – "Under the Water" (White) April 8
 Nicky C – Seasons (Nu Breed Music) April 8
 Mark Brown – The Journey (CR2 / Positiva) Feb 08
 Utah Saints – What Can You Do For Me (White) Feb 08
 Congress – 40 Miles (All Around the World) Sept 07
 Jes – Heaven (Black Hole) May 7
 Arno Cost & Arias "Magenta" (CR2), April 7
 Alex Gold & Phil Oakey – LA Today (Xtravaganza) Jan 07
 Tall Paul & Dave Aude "Common Ground" (Instict), May 6
 Scott Mac "It Must Have Been A Dream" (ATCR), Oct 05
 Cosmic Gate "I Feel Wonderful" (Maelstrom), Aug 05
 Airbiscuit "Lately" (Zenith Cafe), May 5
 Way Out West – "Don’t Forget Me" (Distinctive), March 5
 Hiratzka and Kazell "Venice Dawn" (SR2), Feb 05
 Armin Van Buuren – "Burned With Desire" (Nebula), Jan 05
 Lustral "Every Time" (Earth) June 4
 Space Brothers "Wings Across The Universe" (Boss) April 4
 Space Brothers – One More Chance (Boss)  Jan 04

Artist albums 
 Riley & Durrant – Research & Development (Newstate Music) Jul 07Track list:
 Introduction
 Experiment No 1
 Hollow (ft Gina Dootson)
 Aurora
 Dead Of The Night (ft Gina Dootson)
 Monday Blues
 Tear Down The Walls (ft Gina Dootson & Paul Maddox)
 Experiment No 2 (ft Hauswerks)
 Rock School
 My Enemy (ft Ben Renwick)
 Magnificent Love (f Gina Dootson)
 Candesco (2007 Mix)

References

External links
Capital FM Official Website
Andi Durrant Twitter Page
Riley & Durrant Facebook fan page
Andi Durrant Facebook fan page

English radio DJs